Autovía A-22 or Autovía Huesca-Lleida is an upgrade of a section of the existing N-240 Spanish road, managed by the Spanish Government, between Huesca, the second largest city in Aragón and Lleida, a provincial capital in Catalonia. The route has all sections now open to traffic with the exception of the last 13km into Huesca.

The A-22 runs mainly in parallel to the existing N-240 road except for certain specific stretches such as the Monzón bypass which opened in 2008, and the Barbastro bypass where alternative routes have been employed. The construction has been divided into the following sectors, Huesca-Siétamo, Siétamo-Velillas, Velillas-Ponzano, Ponzano-El Pueyo, Barbastro Bypass, Monzón Bypass, Binéfar Bypass, Binéfar Bypass-Aragón/Catalonia border, Aragón/Catalonia border-Almacelles Bypass, Almacelles Bypass-La Cerdera, La Cerdera-Junction with A-2 Motorway at the edge of Lleida [1].

By the summer of 2010 more than half of the A-22 was operational as a four-lane highway comprising 6 of the above sectors. However, in July 2010 a cessation of work due to governmental financial difficulties was announced, despite the Binefar Bypass section being 80% complete. This decision provoked much controversy with local government officials calling for the work to be resumed, citing the dangers associated with the current unfinished road layout [2]. Work was restarted and by 2012 all but one sector was fully open creating an uninterrupted length of around 99km starting from the intersection with the A-2 on the edge of Lleida. The remaining section is the 13km Huesca - Sietamo sector. Construction began in August 2018 and is ongoing. Until this final section is completed in 2023 or 2024, it remains necessary to transfer onto the N-240 highway to complete the journey into the city of Huesca.

The A-22 provides a far more satisfactory communication between Huesca and Lleida and intermediate towns than previously offered by the N-240, but also a direct four-lane highway connection between Huesca and Barcelona, a journey which previously required a long and time-consuming diversion via Zaragoza if motorway standard roads were used. When the final sector is completed, the A-22 will provide direct access to the Autovía A-23 serving Jaca (Aragón) and connecting to the Autovía A-21 for Pamplona (Navarra) using highways which are also undergoing the process of upgrading.

The improvements in road communication between Lleida and the province of Huesca are occurring in parallel to developments on the railways in the Lleida area, where a new network of commuter trains (Cercanias) is under consideration. This may include a regular commuter service connecting Lleida, Almacelles, Binéfar, Monzón [3] - all of which are communities served by the N-240 and A-22.

List of major towns connected by the existing N-240 and the A-22, includes Lleida, Almacelles, Binéfar, Monzón, Barbastro and Huesca.

References

1. http://www.urbanity.es/foro/infraestructuras/14291-22-autovia-lleida-huesca.html  (Information in Spanish on the progress in construction of the A-22)

2. https://web.archive.org/web/20120307124926/http://www.finanzas.com/noticias/vivienda/2010-07-30/324550_ayuntamiento-binefar-insta-fomento-reanudar.html [Article in Spanish on the controversy surrounding the withdrawal of funds for construction in the Binefar area].

3. https://web.archive.org/web/20110715144842/http://www.radiohuesca.com/hemeroteca/Noticia.aspx?codigo=453421  (Article in Spanish on the proposal to extend the Lleida Cercanias to Monzón, Aragón)

A-22
A-22
A-22